Trophée d'Or Féminin was a women's European bicycle race held in France. The race was discontinued in 2016.

Overall winners

Jerseys

As of the 2016 edition:
 is worn by the overall leader of the race
 is worn by the leader of the mountain classification
 is worn by the leader of the points classification
 is worn by the leader of the young rider classification

References

Cycle races in France
Women's road bicycle races
Recurring sporting events established in 1994
1994 establishments in France
Defunct cycling races in France
Recurring sporting events disestablished in 2016
2016 disestablishments in France